Robert Yuryevich Wipper (– 30 December 1954) was a Russian, Latvian and Soviet historian of classical antiquity, medieval and modern period.

Biography
Born in Moscow, Wipper graduated from the faculty of history and philology at the Moscow University in 1880. In 1894, he had become the Doctor of General History and in 1901–1919 was the Professor in Ordinary of the Department of General History. He later attained the professorship. Wipper lectured the history of prehistoric culture, the history of the Ancient East, Greece, the Roman Republic and the Roman Empire, as well as social ideas and the methodology of history. He also authored several historical textbooks. Having emigrated to Latvia, he taught at the University of Latvia until 1940 when the country was incorporated into the Soviet Union as the Latvian Soviet Socialist Republic. Wipper's works received the privilege of translation into English for foreign readership. In 1922, Wipper published a book about Ivan the Terrible. A revised edition of it, published in 1942, was welcomed by Soviet reviewers. The History of Greece of the Classic Epoch (1916) was a personal favorite of Joseph Stalin. In 1944, Wipper received the Order of the Red Banner of Labour and the Order of Lenin in 1945. He also became a member of the Academy of Sciences of the Soviet Union. Until his death Wipper supported the Christ myth theory.

The first edition of the Great Soviet Encyclopedia characterized him as "the most talented representative in historical science of the Russian petty bourgeois intelligentsia". He died in Moscow at the age of 95.

References

Bibliography
 

1859 births
1954 deaths
20th-century Russian historians
Full Members of the USSR Academy of Sciences
Imperial Moscow University alumni
Moscow State University alumni
Professorships at the Imperial Moscow University
Academic staff of the University of Latvia
Writers from Moscow
Recipients of the Order of Lenin
Recipients of the Order of the Red Banner of Labour
Recipients of the Order of Saint Stanislaus (Russian), 2nd class
Recipients of the Order of St. Anna, 2nd class
Recipients of the Order of St. Vladimir, 4th class
Christ myth theory proponents
Historians from the Russian Empire
20th-century Latvian historians
19th-century historians from the Russian Empire
Russian medievalists
Soviet historians
Soviet medievalists
Burials at Novodevichy Cemetery